Orgram is a village in Bhatar CD block in Bardhaman Sadar North subdivision of Purba Bardhaman district in the state of West Bengal, India.

History
Census 2011 Orgram Village Location Code or Village Code 319767. The village of Orgram is located in the Bhatar tehsil of Burdwan district in West Bengal, India.

Demographics
The total geographic area of village is 2938.76 hectares. Orgram features a total population of 13,554 peoples. There are about 3,229 houses in Orgram village

Caste
In Orgram village, most of the villagers are from Schedule Caste (SC) and Schedule Tribe (ST). Schedule Caste (SC) constitutes 45.98 % while Schedule Tribe (ST) were 26.96 % of total population in Orgram village.

Population and house data

Transport 

Healthcare
Nearest Rural Hospital at Bhatar (with 60 beds) is the main medical facility in Bhatar CD block. There are primary health centres

References

External links
 Map
 Ratanpur

Villages in Purba Bardhaman district